Bertrand Cantat (born 5 March 1964) is a French murderer, songwriter, singer, and musician known for being the former frontman of the rock band Noir Désir. In 2003, he was proven guilty without a doubt and convicted of the murder ("murder with indirect intent"  dolus eventualis) of French actress Marie Trintignant, which occurred in a hotel room in Vilnius. Cantat returned to Noir Désir after his release from prison in 2007, playing with the group until it disbanded in 2010. He subsequently formed a musical duo with Pascal Humbert, calling themselves Détroit.

Early life
Cantat was born in Pau, Pyrénées-Atlantiques. The son of a navy officer, he spent his childhood in Le Havre. His family moved when he was an adolescent to Bordeaux. At the lycée Saint-Genès, he met Denis Barthe, Serge Teyssot-Gay, and Frédéric Vidalenc, who soon became members of his band.

Biography
At the height of Noir Désir's success in the 1990s, Cantat was a prominent figure in French music. Noir Désir is regarded "to have made the history of the French rock scene for three decades". He was known for the quality of his lyrics, charisma, and live performances, often compared to Jim Morrison of the Doors.

In 1997, Cantat married Krisztina Rády, an art director of Hungarian descent, with whom he had two children; Milo, born in 1998, and Alice, born in 2003.

Murder and imprisonment, 2003–2007
In 2003, Cantat began an affair with French actress Marie Trintignant. On 26 July of that year, Cantat and Trintignant got in a fight in a hotel room in Vilnius, Lithuania, following a dispute over a text message. Seven hours later, Trintignant's brother called emergency services to the couple's Vilnius hotel room, as Trintignant had slipped into a deep coma. She died of swelling to the brain several days later in hospital. The post-mortem examination suggested that Cantat had inflicted 19 blows to Trintignant's head, causing irreversible brain damage. In court, Cantat claimed he "slapped" Trintignant four times before putting her to bed. He claimed he had flown into a jealous rage after she received a text message from her husband, Samuel Benchetrit. Trintignant was 41 at the time of her death, and left four young sons. French medical experts at the hearing confirmed Cantat's claim regarding the slapping, as well as his claim that he could not tell that Trintignant was dying. His house was burned down in Moustey. His spouse and his two children initially were supposed to be in the house at that time, but were in Bordeaux, instead.

In March 2004, Cantat was sentenced by Vilnius Regional Court under Article 129 of the Lithuanian Criminal Code to eight years in prison for murder, committed with indirect intent (dolus eventualis). The verdict was at first appealed by Marie Trintignant's family, who believed that her killing warranted a harsher sentence, and later by Cantat, who wanted the higher court to reclassify his crime as manslaughter, and therefore lessen his sentence. Both parties ultimately decided to cancel their appeals, which rendered final the original sentence of eight years. At the request of his lawyers, Cantat was moved from the Lithuanian Lukiškės prison, to a prison near Muret, France, in September 2004. Cantat served four years of his eight-year sentence in prison. According to French law, after half of a prison sentence has been served, a criminal with good behavior can be released to serve the rest of his sentence on parole.

Release, suicide of former wife and band break up, 2007–2010
Cantat was released from the French prison on parole in October 2007, after serving half of his sentence. His early release aroused the anger of women's rights activists and the victim's parents, who had failed to persuade French President Nicolas Sarkozy and French judges to block his early release.

On the night of 10 January 2010, Cantat's former wife Krisztina Rády died by suicide. At the time of her death, Bertrand Cantat was present in the house. She was discovered by their children the following day. Shortly before her death, Rády had complained of mental abuse by Cantat. The physical abuse she complained of on the answering machine is that he threw some objects at her, but she never mentioned that he was assaulting her. According to Cantat, Rády's parents had spent a week with him after the suicide. Magistrates in Bordeaux investigated Cantat in connection with Rady's suicide, but ultimately decided not to press charges.

In October 2010, three months after his probational status of release was lifted and his sentence declared completed, Cantat resumed his musical career with a gig in Bordeaux. His re-entry into the public eye vexed women's rights campaigners and victim support groups. On 30 November 2010, Noir Désir announced that it would split up for good. Cantat has continued as a solo musician.

Since Noir Désir's breakup, 2011–present

Wajdi Mouawad
In early 2011, Canadian Lebanese playwright Wajdi Mouawad chose Cantat to sing in his production in Montreal of a Sophocles cycle, entitled Chœurs. This sparked public criticism due to Cantat's murder conviction. Politicians proposed to ban Cantat's entry into the country, as Canada's immigration legislation bars from entry anyone convicted abroad of a crime which is punishable in Canada by a maximum term of at least 10 years in prison, until at least five years have passed since the end of the complete sentence handed down. Manslaughter carries a maximum penalty of life imprisonment in Canada. Cantat, who had been sentenced to eight years in jail in Lithuania in 2004, was freed in 2007 after serving half his term.

Chœurs
In April 2011, the artistic director of Théâtre du Nouveau Monde, Lorraine Pintal, announced that Cantat would not be performing in Chœurs. Wajdi Mouawad responded to the controversy by publishing an open letter to his three-year-old daughter Aimee in the newspaper Le Devoir, in which he argued for Cantat's right to full reintegration into society.

In November 2011, Cantat released the album Chœurs, composed for Mouawad's namesake production with musicians Pascal Humbert, Bernard Falaise, and Alexander MacSween.

Détroit
In November 2013 Cantat released the album Horizons  credited to his duo Détroit with Pascal Humbert on Barclay Records label. The first single, titled "Droit dans le Soleil", had been released on 30 September 2013.

Discography

Albums

Singles
As lead artist

Featured in

*Did not appear in the official Belgian Ultratop 50 charts, but rather in the bubbling under Ultratip charts.

References

External links
Profile: Bertrand Cantat
Noir Désir

1964 births
Living people
People from Pau, Pyrénées-Atlantiques
French singer-songwriters
French rock singers
People convicted of murder by Lithuania
French people convicted of manslaughter
French people imprisoned abroad